The Indian giant squirrel or Malabar giant squirrel (Ratufa indica) is a large multi-coloured tree squirrel species endemic to forests and woodlands in India. It is a diurnal, arboreal, and mainly herbivorous squirrel.

Distribution and habitat
This species is endemic to India, with main sections of its distribution in the Western Ghats, Eastern Ghats and Satpura Range as far north as Madhya Pradesh (approximately 22° N). In general, its distribution is fragmented because it is intolerant of habitat degradation.

Description

It has a conspicuous one-, two-, or three-toned colour scheme. The colours involved can be whitish, creamy-beige, buff, tan, rust, reddish-maroon, brown, dark seal brown, or black. The underparts and the front legs are usually cream coloured, and the head can be brown or beige, and there is a distinctive white spot between the ears. Otherwise the colours depend on the subspecies.

Subspecies

Ten subspecies have been described, but recent authorities generally recognise four:

R. i. indica: Found in the northern and central Western Ghats from around Mumbai to Karnataka. Its upper parts and basal half of the tail are rich reddish-maroon or reddish-brown; the distal part of the tail is whitish or buff. On occasion there can be some black at the shoulder or at the very base of the tail (features typically associated with other subspecies). A few other subspecies have been described within its range based on variations in size, overall colour hue and width of the pale tail-tip, but recent authorities generally regard them as synonyms of R. i. indica.
R. i. centralis: From central and eastern India, notably in the Satpura Range and Eastern Ghats (all other subspecies are from the Western Ghats region). It is relatively small and further differs from R. i. indica by its black shoulder region, black tail except for the pale tip, and sometimes black rump.
R. i. dealbata: Found in southern Gujarat (far northern Western Ghats region), but recent surveys have failed to locate it, and it is possibly extinct. A highly distinctive pale subspecies that is overall creamy-buff with a whitish tail and brown ears. It should not be confused with true albinos, rarely recorded in the Indian giant squirrel, which are whiter and have pink eyes unlike R. i. dealbata.
R. i. maxima: From southern Western Ghats. It resembles a large R. i. centralis, but with more extensive black in the shoulder region and on the rump, and an almost entirely black tail (no pale tip). There is often a black dorsal stripe connecting the black shoulder region and rump. Another subspecies, R. i. bengalensis, has been described from southern Karnataka and northern Kerala, in between R. i. indica and R. i. maxima. It generally resembles R. i. indica, but the tail is black except for its pale tip and sometimes it has black shoulders, thus approaching R. i. maxima or R. i. centralis. Its intermediate appearance and distribution has caused some questions about its validity; it could be regarded as an intergrade and recent authorities often treat it as a synonym of R. i. maxima.

Behaviour

The Indian giant squirrel is an upper-canopy dwelling species, which rarely leaves the trees, and requires "tall profusely branched trees for the construction of nests." When in danger, the Ratufa indica often freezes or flattens itself against the tree trunk, instead of fleeing. Its main predators are the birds of prey like owls and the leopard. The Giant Squirrel is mostly active in the early hours of the morning and in the evening, resting in the midday. They are typically solitary animals that only come together for breeding. The species is believed to play a substantial role in shaping the ecosystem of its habitat by engaging in seed dispersal. Diet includes fruit, flowers, nuts and tree bark. Some subspecies are omnivorous, also eating insects and bird eggs.

Family life
The Indian giant squirrel lives alone or in pairs. They build large globular nests of twigs and leaves, placing them on thinner branches where large predators can't get to them. These nests become conspicuous in deciduous forests during the dry season. An individual may build several nests in a small area of forest which are used as sleeping quarters, with one being used as a nursery.

Reproduction
Captive breeding of the Malayan giant squirrel, a close relative has indicated births in March, April, September and December. The young weigh 74.5g at birth and have a length of 27.3 cm. In Canara, the Indian Giant Squirrel has been spotted with young in March.

Recognition
The Indian giant squirrel (shekaru in Marathi) is the state animal of the state of Maharashtra in western India.

See also
 Indian giant flying squirrel

References

Further reading

External links

Ratufa
Rodents of India
Endemic fauna of India
Symbols of Maharashtra
Mammals described in 1777
Taxa named by Johann Christian Polycarp Erxleben